A tipi , often called a lodge in English, is a conical tent, historically made of animal hides or pelts, and in more recent generations of canvas, stretched on a framework of wooden poles. The word is Siouan, and in use in Dakhótiyapi, Lakȟótiyapi, and as a loanword  in US and Canadian English, where it is sometimes spelled phonetically as teepee  and tepee (also pronounced ).

Historically, the tipi has been used by some Indigenous peoples of the Plains in the Great Plains and Canadian Prairies of North America, notably the seven tribes of the Sioux, as well as among the Iowa people, the Otoe and Pawnee, and among the Blackfeet, Crow, Assiniboines, Arapaho, and Plains Cree. They are also used west of the Rocky Mountains by Indigenous peoples of the Plateau such as the Yakama and the Cayuse. They are still in use in many of these communities, though now primarily for ceremonial purposes rather than daily living. Modern tipis usually have a canvas covering. 

Non-Native people have often stereotypically and incorrectly assumed all Native Americans in the United States and Indigenous peoples in Canada live in tipis, which is incorrect, as many Native American cultures and civilizations and First Nations from other regions have used other types of dwellings (pueblos, wigwams, hogans, chickees, and longhouses).

Etymology and nomenclature 

The word tipi comes into English from the Lakota language.

The wigwam or "wickiup", a dome-shaped shelter typically made of bark layered on a pole structure, was also used by various tribes, especially for hunting camps. The term wigwam has often been incorrectly used to refer to a conical skin tipi.

The conventional translation in French and English for all Indigenous dwellings at one time was "lodge," resulting in many compounds and place names such as sweatlodge, lodgepole pine, Red Lodge, and so on.

Types and utility

Structure 
A tipi is distinguished from other conical tents by the smoke flaps at the top of the structure. The tipi is durable, provides warmth and comfort in winter, is cool in the heat of summer, and is dry during heavy rains. Tipis can be disassembled and packed away quickly when people need to relocate and can be reconstructed quickly upon settling in a new area. Historically, this portability was important to Plains Indians with their at-times nomadic lifestyle. Tribes would have well-organized camp circles of family units living in multiple tipis arranged in order depending on rank or roles in the family unit, community, or ceremony. Generally, the door and camp openings face east in the direction of the sunrise.

These poles, "after being tied together at the small ends, are raised upright with a twist so as to cross the poles above the fastening." They stretch a covering of tanned and untanned buffalo hides, sewn together, over the frame, which they then secure with stakes at the base. "At the top there is an extra skin adjusted as a collar, so as to be open on the windward side to facilitate the exit of the smoke. A low opening is left for a doorway, which is covered with an extra skin used as a drop. The fire-pit and arrangements for beds are the same as in the Ojibwa lodge, grass being used in the place of spruce or hemlock twigs."

Lodgepole pine is the preferred wood in the Northern and Central Plains and red cedar in the Southern Plains.  Tipis have a detachable cover over the structure. The cover has historically been made of buffalo hide, an optional skin or cloth lining, and a canvas or bison calf skin door. Modern lodges are more often made of canvas.

Ropes (historically rawhide thongs or babiche) and wooden pegs are required to bind the poles, close the cover, attach the lining and door, and anchor the resulting structure to the ground. Tipis are distinguished from other tents by two crucial elements: the opening at the top and the smoke flaps, which allow the dwellers to heat themselves and cook with an open fire; and the lining that is primarily used in the winter, which insulates. Tipis were designed to be easily set up or taken down to allow camps to be moved to follow game migrations, especially the bison. When dismantled the tipi poles were used to construct a dog- or later horse-pulled travois on which additional poles and tipi cover were placed.

Tipi covers are made by sewing together strips of canvas or tanned hide and cutting out a semicircular shape from the resulting surface. Trimming this shape yields a door and the smoke flaps that allow the dwellers to control the chimney effect to expel smoke from their fires.

Decoration 

Historically, most tipis in a village were not painted. Painted tipis often depicted noteworthy historical battles and often featured geometric portrayals of celestial bodies and animal designs. Sometimes tipis have been painted to depict personal experiences such as war, hunting, a dream, or vision. When depicting visions, "ceremonies and prayers were first offered, and then the dreamer recounted his dream to the priests and wise men of the community. Those known to be skilled painters were consulted, and the new design was made to fit anonymously within the traditional framework of the tribe's painted tipis."

During the later reservation era, retired warriors would paint on canvas tipis depicting different events in tribal history, including battles with Americans. He Nupa Wanica (Joseph No Two Horns), a Hunkpapa Lakota warrior who fought in 40 battles, including the Battle of the Little Bighorn, is one such artist known for his many tipi paintings, shields and horse effigies now in museums.

Teachings

Tribes in the modern-day use the tipi as means to teach traditional, scientific and psychological teachings.  The Siksika (Blackfoot) nation's worldview is based on the shape of a tipi, which inspired Maslow's hierarchy of needs teachings. In Cree communities, the tipi can represent the power of women and her role as the foundation of the family unit. In Lakota communities, youth are taught how to assemble tipis with each pole representing different traditional virtues, understanding geometry and learning teamwork.

See also 

 Chum (tent), a similar structure used by various peoples from northwestern Siberia to northern Mongolia.
 Goahti, a somewhat similar structure used by the Sami people of northern Scandinavia
 Oca, a typical Indigenous Brazilian house
 Hogan
 Igloo, also ilgu
 Lavvu, a conical tent covered with reindeer hides, used by the Sámi people of northern Scandinavia
 List of human habitation forms
 Longhouse
 The Tepee
 Plains hide painting
 Wigwam Motel
 Yurt
 Lone Teepee, a historic place in Montana, US
 List of house types

References and notes 
General
 Holley, Linda A. Tipis, Tepees, Teepees: History and Design of the Cloth Tipi. Gibbs-Smith, 2007.
 Reginald Laubin, Gladys Laubin, Stanley Vestal, The Indian Tipi: its History, Construction, and Use. Norman: University of Oklahoma Press, 1989, .
 American Anthropologist. Vol. 16; No. 1. American Anthropological Association of Washington, 1914.
Citations

Notes

External links 

Tour of a Lakota tipi via Sinte Gleska University
Blackfoot Tipi lessons via Blackfoot Crossing
Cree Tipi Virtues via Lac La Ronge Indian Band

 
Indigenous culture of the Great Plains
Indigenous architecture
House types
Portable buildings and shelters
Traditional Native American dwellings
Tents
Lakota words and phrases
Western (genre) staples and terminology